Maria Thattil is an Australian author,  media personality and pageant winner who was crowned Miss Universe Australia 2020 and then represented Australia at Miss Universe 2020, where she was placed in the top 10.

Early life
Thattil is Indian Australian. She was born in Melbourne after her parents migrated from India to Australia in the early 1990s.

Career
Thattil  was named Miss Universe Australia in October 2020, and was placed in the top 10 of the global competition as only the third woman of colour to represent Australia.

In January 2022, Thattil appeared as a contestant on the eighth season of I’m a Celebrity…Get Me Out of Here! Australia. She was the second contestant to be eliminated. While in the jungle, she came out as bisexual.

Thattil is a supporter of diversity, inclusion and equality.  She is an advocate for women, the LGBTQIA+ community  and anti-racism.

In 2023, she became an author with Unbounded, a book that navigates the complexities of identity.

Personal life
Thattil identifies as bisexual and is in a relationship. She revealed that she had an abortion at age 21. She lives in Melbourne.

References

External links

Living people
Miss Universe 2020 contestants
Miss Universe Australia winners
Australian people of Indian descent
Year of birth missing (living people)
Australian bisexual people
Models from Melbourne